Utladalen Landscape Protection Area is adjacent to Jotunheimen National Park, covering Utladalen, Norway's deepest valley.

It includes both the Utladalen and Avdalen valleys as well as areas that extend both westward and northward to Jotunheimen National Park, and eastward to lake Tyin. The waterfall Vettisfossen and the mountain Falketind are both located within the protection area.

References

External links
 Map of Jotunheimen National Park and Utladalen Landscape Protection Area 

Landscape protection areas in Norway
Geography of Vestland
Protected areas established in 1980
1980 establishments in Norway